Reticella (also reticello or in French point coupé or point couppe) is a needle lace dating from the 15th century and remaining popular into the first quarter of the 17th century. 

Reticella was originally a form of cutwork in which threads were pulled from linen fabric to make a "grid" on which the pattern was stitched, primarily using buttonhole stitch.  Later reticella used a grid made of thread rather than a fabric ground.  Both methods resulted in a characteristic geometric design of squares and circles with various arched or scalloped borders.

Books of patterns for reticella designed by Federico de Vinciolo (France, 1587) and Cesare Vecellio (Italy, probably from the 1590s but printed 1617) were popular and were frequently reprinted.

Reticella developed into Punto in Aria.

Gallery

Notes

References
Berry, Robin L.: "Reticella: a walk through the beginnings of Lace" (2004) (PDF)
Kliot, Jules and Kaethe: The Needle-Made Lace of Reticella, Lacis Publications, Berkeley, CA, 1994. .
Montupet, Janine, and Ghislaine Schoeller: Lace: The Elegant Web, .
Ribeiro, Aileen: Fashion and Fiction: Dress in Art and Literature in Stuart England, Yale, 2005, 
Vinciolo, Federico: Renaissance Patterns for Lace, Embroidery and Needlepoint, Dover Books, 1971.

External links

Online facsimile of Vinciolo's Les Singuliers et Nouveaux Pourtaicts
 Reticella - Virtual Museum of Textile Arts

Needle lace
Textile arts of Italy
Textile arts of France